Alexander Shand (1840–1910) was a notable New Zealand farmer, interpreter and ethnographer. He was born in Petone, Wellington, New Zealand in 1840. His views on "sentiment" influenced William McDougall's theory of instinct.

References

1840 births
1910 deaths
New Zealand ethnologists
People from Petone
Interpreters
19th-century translators